Ruskov is a village and municipality in Košice-okolie District in the Kosice Region of eastern Slovakia.

History
In historical records the village was first mentioned in 1303.

Geography
The village lies at an elevation of 223 m and covers an area of 20.208 km². The municipality has a population of about 1,350 people.

Transport
The village has a railway station and people in the village like to use the railway.

References

Villages and municipalities in Košice-okolie District